Rumatha bihinda is a species of snout moth in the genus Rumatha. It was described by Harrison Gray Dyar Jr. in 1922. It is found in North America, including California, Texas, New Mexico, Arizona and Nevada.

The wingspan is 30–35 mm for males and 32–36 mm for females. The palpi, head, thorax, forewings and abdomen are dark fuscous, dusted with white. The hindwings are white and semihyaline.

The larvae feed on Cylindropuntia species. They are solitary feeders within the stems of their host plant.

References

Moths described in 1922
Phycitinae